The January 31 – February 2, 2015 North American blizzard was a major winter storm that plowed through the majority of the United States, dumping as much as  of new snowfall across a path from Iowa to New England, as well as blizzard conditions in early February 2015. It came less than a week after another crippling blizzard which impacted the Northeast with 2–3 feet of snow. It was the first of many intense winter storms to occur in the nation during the month of February, partly in due to an ongoing cold wave that was beginning to take shape shortly after the storm subsided.

Ahead of the storm, residents mainly in the Midwest prepared for potential whiteout or even blizzard conditions. Up to 15 people were killed by the blizzard, and it knocked out power for hundreds of thousands of people.

Meteorological history 

On January 30, an upper-level low moved ashore into California. Pumping some moisture from the Pacific Ocean, it began to produce snow in the high mountainous terrains of New Mexico and Arizona. It began to dive southwards into Mexico late on January 31, and at the same time, a trough dived southwards into the United States. A surface area of low pressure developed as a result of this along an arctic front that was moving through the High Plains. Early on February 1, the winter storm began to move eastwards on a near 1,900-mile long path. The cities around the Chicago and Detroit areas were among the locations that got slammed the hardest by the blizzard. As the blizzard continued to move eastwards, winds continued to increase which resulted in higher snow drifts in some locations. The Northeast was its next target. Late on February 1, snow began to spread into parts of New York City and parts of New England. The snow continued to gradually move eastwards until it had reached the southwestern parts of New England overnight. By now the area of low pressure had reached central Pennsylvania, with its warm front passing through New York City. As it continued to move to the east, the snow began to gradually taper off as snowbands pulled away, the system continued to intensify before peaking at  late on February 3, and dissipating a day later.

Preparations and impact

Midwest 
The majority of impacts were felt in the Midwest, especially in and around the areas around Chicago. On February 1, a blizzard warning was issued for the region. Several school closings were announced across most of the Midwest due to predicted snowfall accumulations of more than a foot. Detroit received , which made this the third heaviest snowstorm in the city.

The same day, Springfield Governor Rauner activated the State Incident Response Center. The Illinois Department of Transportation announced that they would have approximately 1,700 snow trucks ready to plow snowfall on roadways and 3,700 employees on standby for help.

Southern Ontario 
 of snow were reported across Southern Ontario. Many schools were closed across the region. In Toronto, more than 200 flights were cancelled or delayed at Toronto Pearson International Airport, and dozens more at Billy Bishop Airport.

Snowfall reports 
This is a list of the largest snowfall reports by state impacted by the storm.

 Maine
 near Ellsworth

 New Hampshire
 near Bow

 Vermont
 in Woodford

 Massachusetts
 in Lunenburg

 Rhode Island
 in West Glocester

 Connecticut
 in Weston

 New York
 in Webster

 New Jersey
 in West Milford

 Pennsylvania
 in Cranesville

 Maryland
 in Oakland

 Ohio
 near Waterville

 Michigan
 in Kalamazoo

 Ontario
 in Windsor

 Indiana
 near Plymouth

 Wisconsin
 near Pleasant Prairie

 Illinois
 near Lincolnshire

 Iowa
 near Polk City

 Missouri
 near Hurdland

 Minnesota
 in Albert Lea

 Nebraska
 in Pender

 South Dakota
 in Yankton

 Kansas
 in Corning

 Colorado
 near Louisville

 New Mexico
 near Los Alamos

 Utah
 in East Willow Creek

See also 
February 2016 North American winter storm
December 17–22, 2012 North American blizzard
January 31 – February 2, 2011 North American blizzard
January 31 – February 3, 2021 nor'easter

References 

2015-01-31
2015 meteorology
2015 natural disasters in the United States
2015 in Maine
2015 in Massachusetts
January 2015 events in the United States
February 2015 events in the United States
Natural disasters in Massachusetts